Joseph Taiwo (born 24 August 1959) is a retired Nigerian athlete who competed in the triple jump.

His personal best was 17.22 metres, achieved in June 1988 in Bauchi. This ranks him second among Nigerian triple jumpers, behind Ajayi Agbebaku, and fifth in Africa, behind Ndabazinhle Mdhlongwa, Agbebaku, Khotso Mokoena and Andrew Owusu.

He is the father of American decathlete Jeremy Taiwo.

Achievements

References

External links

1959 births
Living people
Nigerian male triple jumpers
Athletes (track and field) at the 1984 Summer Olympics
Athletes (track and field) at the 1988 Summer Olympics
Olympic athletes of Nigeria
African Games silver medalists for Nigeria
African Games medalists in athletics (track and field)
Athletes (track and field) at the 1987 All-Africa Games
20th-century Nigerian people